Para-snowboarding classification is the classification system for para-snowboarding. The sport originally called Adaptive Snowboard is now practiced by hundreds of athletes around the world. The International Paralympic Committee (IPC) defines three classes: SB-LL for athletes with a physical impairment affecting one or both legs (with SB-LL1 and SB-LL2 for more- and less-severe impairment), and SB-UL for athletes with a physical impairment affecting one or both arms who compete standing. The sport made its official Winter Paralympic debut in the 2014 Winter Paralympics in Sochi, Russia.

Eligibility
Classifications exist for deaf competitors, blind competitors, people with physical disabilities and those with intellectual disabilities. The IPC eligibility rules provide for athletes with a physical impairment such as limb loss or limb deficiency, spinal cord injury, nerve damage, or cerebral palsy. , athletes with other impairments, such as visual impairments, are not eligible. The IPC defined two competition classes in 2014:
 SB-LL for athletes with a physical impairment affecting one or both legs. Athletes may use a prosthesis or modified equipment to compete.
 SB-UL for athletes with a physical impairment affecting one or both arms who compete standing.

For the 2018 Winter Paralympics in PyeongChang, South Korea, the IPC divided the SB-LL category in twain:

 SB-LL1 for athletes with significant impairment to one leg, such as amputation above the knee, or "a significant combined impairment in two legs", affecting their balance, their board-control and their ability to navigate uneven terrain.
 SB-LL2 for athletes with impairment to one or both legs "with less activity limitation", such as below-knee amputation.
 SB-UL for athletes upper limb impairments, affecting balance. There were no events for female athletes in the category SB-UL in the 2018 games.

The World Snowboard Federation (WSF) has a more elaborate classification system, with classes SB1 to SB12 for snowboarders with limb disabilities:
 SB1 for athletes with severe disabilities in both lower limbs
 SB2 for athletes with severe disabilities in one lower limb
 SB3 for athletes with moderate disabilities in both lower limbs
 SB4 for athletes with moderate disabilities in one lower limbs
 SB5 for athletes with disabilities in both upper limbs
 SB6 for athletes with disabilities in one upper limb
 SB9 for athletes with disabilities in one upper and one lower limb
 SB10 sitting class for athletes with disabilities in both lower limbs and trunk
 SB11 sitting class for athletes with disabilities in both lower limbs and partial trunk function
 SB12 sitting class for athletes with disabilities in lower limbs and good trunk function
The WSF also defines three visual impairment class, B1, B2 and B3, identical to those used by the International Blind Sports Federation (IBSA) for other sports for visually impaired athletes.

Governance
The sport widely called Adaptive Snowboarding  held its first official competition at the 2000 USASA Nationals in Waterville Valley NH, USA. The USASA governed adaptive snowboarding competitions in North America through 2008, after which the World Snowboard Federation accepted international governance beginning in 2009. It is now practiced by hundreds of athletes around the world, and governed by the International Paralympic Committee (IPC). The IPC and the WSF signed a memorandum of understanding in July 2009 under which the WSF would continue to govern the sport until 2014, after which the situation would be reassessed. Both organisations would continue their efforts to develop the sport. IPC Alpine Skiing governs snowboarding as well as alpine skiing, and the two share a common set of regulations. In explaining the change of the name of the sport, the WSF stated that:

For Australian competitors in this sport, the sport and classification is managed the national sport federation with support from the Australian Paralympic Committee.  There are three types of classification available for Australian competitors: Provisional, national and international.  The first is for club level competitions, the second for state and national competitions, and the third for international competitions.

At the Paralympic Games
After initially rejecting the sport in August 2011, the International Paralympic Committee changed its mind and added Para-snowboarding to the Alpine Skiing programme on 2 May 2012. The President of the Sochi 2014 Olympic Organizing Committee, Dmitry Chernyshenko, welcomed the addition of the new sport, saying:

The sport made its official Winter Paralympic debut in the 2014 Winter Paralympics in Sochi, Russia. There were men's and women's standing snowboard cross. Only events in the SB-LL class were offered. The events were run in a time-trial format (one rider on course at a time), and. unlike some other Paralympic events, results were calculated without factors that adjust times based on disability classification. Each athlete got three runs over a course of jumps, bumps and turns. Times from the best two were added together for their final total.

Both events were run on 14 March 2014. The women's event was won by Bibian Mentel-Spee from the Netherlands in a time of 1 minute 57.43 seconds. France's Cecile Hernandez Ep Cervellon came second with a time of 2 minutes 07.31 seconds. America's Amy Purdy came third in 2 minutes 14.29 seconds. The men's event was a clean sweep for the United States. Evan Strong won in 1 minute 43.61 seconds, followed by Michael Shea with a time of 1:44.18 and Keith Gabel with a time of 1:47.10.

Future
The snowboarding cross events at Sochi were a success, with tickets for para-snowboarding events being among the first to sell out. In April 2014 the IPC announced plans to add slalom to the events at 2018 Winter Paralympics in Pyeongchang, South Korea. Consideration was also given to having the snowboard cross event run with pairs of athletes competing against each other rather than as a time trial. There were still no plans to add non-standing or visually impaired events. , visually impaired events were not considered for medal events at WSF Para-Snowboard competitions due to the small numbers of internationally competitive athletes.

External links

References

Parasports classifications
Snowboarding